Shear may refer to:

Textile production
Animal shearing, the collection of wool from various species
Sheep shearing
The removal of nap during wool cloth production

Science and technology

Engineering
Shear strength (soil), the shear strength of soil under loading
Shear line (locksmithing), where the inner cylinder ends and the outer cylinder begins in a cylinder lock
Shearing (manufacturing), a metalworking process which cuts stock without the formation of chips or the use of burning or melting
Shear (sheet metal), various tools to shear sheet metal
Board shear, in bookbinding, a tool to cut board or paper
Shear pin, in machinery, such as a plough, designed to shear (break) when a certain force is exceeded, to protect other components of the machine.
Shearing interferometer, in optics, a simple and very common means to check the collimation of beams by observing interference
Shearing in computer graphics, more commonly called screen tearing
Shear wall, a wall composed of braced panels to counter the effects of lateral load acting on a structure
Shear forming, different from conventional metal spinning in that a reduction of the wall thickness is induced

Mathematics/astronomy
Cosmic shear, an effect of distortion of image of distant galaxies due to deflection of light by matter, as predicted by general relativity (see also  gravitational lens)
Shear mapping, a particular type of mapping in linear algebra, also called transvection
Shear matrix in geometry, a linear transformation shearing a space

Solid materials
Shear (geology), a form of fault in rocks
Shear stress in physics, refers to a stress state that will cause shearing (see verb) when it exceeds a material's shear strength
Shearing (physics), the deformation of a material substance in which parallel internal surfaces slide past one another
Shear strength, shear strength

Wind/fluids
Simple shear, a special case of deformation of a fluid 
Shear (fluid), in fluid dynamics, refers to the shear stresses and responses there to in fluids
Shear rate, a gradient of velocity in a flowing material
Shear line (meteorology), an area of wind shear
Wind shear, a difference in wind speed or direction between two wind currents in the atmosphere

Surnames
Shear (surname)
Shearing (surname)

Other
Shear (comics), a Marvel Comics superhero

See also

Shears (disambiguation)
Shearer (disambiguation)
Sheer (disambiguation)
Sher (disambiguation)
Shere, Surrey, England